Tachinini is a tribe of flies in the family Tachinidae.

Genera
Adejeania Townsend, 1913
Archytas Jaennicke, 1867
Chrysomikia Mesnil, 1970
Cnephaotachina Brauer & von Bergenstamm, 1894
Copecrypta Townsend, 1908
Deopalpus Townsend, 1908
Epalpus Rondani, 1850
Germaria Robineau-Desvoidy, 1830
Hystriomyia Portschinsky, 1881
Jurinella Brauer & von Bergenstamm, 1889
Jurinia Robineau-Desvoidy, 1830
Juriniopsis Townsend, 1916
Laufferiella Villeneuve, 1929
Mesnilisca Zimin, 1974
Mikia Kowarz, 1885
Nowickia Wachtl, 1894
Paradejeania Brauer & von Bergenstamm, 1893
Pararchytas Brauer & von Bergenstamm, 1895
Parepalpus Coquillett, 1902
Peleteria Robineau-Desvoidy, 1830
Protodejeania Townsend, 1915
Rhachoepalpus Townsend, 1908
Sarromyia Pokorny, 1893
Schineria Rondani, 1865
Tachina Meigen, 1803
Xanthoepalpus Townsend, 1914

References

Diptera of Europe
Brachycera tribes
Tachininae